The 1986 Commonwealth Final was the third running of the Commonwealth Final as part of the qualification for the 1986 Speedway World Championship. The 1986 Final was run on 8 June at the Belle Vue Stadium in Manchester, England, and was part of the World Championship qualifying for riders from the Commonwealth nations.

After being missing from the World Championship from 1981 to 1985, the Commonwealth Final returned to the calendar in 1986. Riders qualified for the re-introduced Final from the Australian, British and New Zealand Championships.

8 June
 Manchester, Belle Vue Stadium
Qualification: Top 11 plus 1 reserve to the 1986 Overseas Final in Coventry, England

Classification

References

See also
 Motorcycle Speedway

1986
World Individual
Commonwealth Final
Commonwealth Final
Commonwealth Final
International sports competitions in Manchester